The Reggio Children – Loris Malaguzzi Centre Foundation (Fondazione Reggio Children Centro Loris Malaguzzi) is an international nonprofit foundation for the promotion of the Reggio Emilia approach around the world. The foundation, which is based in Reggio Emilia, Emilia-Romagna, Italy, was launched in September 2011, and is dedicated to the memory of Loris Malaguzzi, who developed the Reggio Emilia approach.

NGOs and/or cooperatives constitute most of the founding partners of the foundation: North American Reggio Emilia Alliance (NAREA; North America), Reggio Emilia Institutet (Sweden), Red Solare Argentina, Cooperativa Italiana di Ristorazione (CIR; Italy), Cooperativa Sociale Coopselios (Italy), and Fondazione Manodori (Italy). Other partners are EFFE 2005 Gruppo Feltrinelli S.p.A., a private holding company for laeffe (an Italian television channel owned by the Feltrinelli media group), and the municipal/city council of Reggio Emilia (Comune di Reggio Emilia).

The foundation states that its mission and aims include: recognising the potential and rights of children from birth; sharing the educational values of the Reggio Emilia approach through dialogue with other countries and experiences, promoting the Loris Malaguzzi International Centre (Centro Internazionale Loris Malaguzzi) as a place of research, innovation and experimentation; strengthening the educational experience offered by the partners, so that they continue to maintain the quality of their education services; respond to requests for exchange and collaboration; act as a motor for the development of research projects, with national and international partners, and; organizing and developing initiatives in the realm of solidarity and international cooperation in general.

There are three major projects/foci of the foundation.
 Remida: promoting both the collection, organisation and distribution of materials discarded by manufacturing businesses – and a culture of creative re-use of discarded materials; (The name is a play on words in Italian: "RE" is the initials of Reggio Emilia, mida means "gives me" and Re Mida is also Italian for "King Midas".)
 Educa: (Italian: "educates") a joint project with the European Union, promoting the role of the community in improving the quality of education for children aged from three to 14 years, and;
  The Loris Malaguzzi Award, which recognises contributions to the promotion of the Reggio Emilia approach, the thought of Loris Malaguzzi, and/or children's education in general.

References

External links

Educational foundations
Children's charities based in Italy
2011 establishments in Italy
Foundations based in Italy
Organisations based in Reggio Emilia
Organizations established in 2011